Bradley Ryan Fullmer (born January 17, 1975) is a former Major League Baseball first baseman and designated hitter. In an eight-year career, he played for the Montreal Expos (1997–1999), Toronto Blue Jays (2000–2001), Anaheim Angels (2002–2003), and the Texas Rangers (2004).

Career
Fullmer played baseball at Montclair College Preparatory School in Van Nuys, California where he hit .568 with 15 home runs as a senior. Fullmer committed to play college baseball at Stanford but was lured away from his commitment after the Montreal Expos selected him in the second round of the 1993 Major League Baseball Draft and offered him a package worth $520,000. Fullmer went to high school with another future Major League player, Russ Ortiz, whom he played against in the 2002 World Series.

He hit a home run in his first major league at bat on September 2, 1997. Fullmer's best season came in 2000, while playing for the Toronto Blue Jays. In 133 games, he hit career bests in home runs (32), RBIs (104), and batting average (.295). Fullmer was a member of the World Series champion Anaheim Angels in 2002.

Fullmer's final game at the major league level was during the 2004 season with the Texas Rangers. He spent nearly all of 2005 out of baseball healing from injuries, before joining the Charlotte Knights near season's end, though he never played for them and would eventually retire.

In 807 games over eight seasons, Fullmer posted a .279 batting average (778-for-2789) with 395 runs, 203 doubles, 16 triples, 114 home runs, 442 RBI, 32 stolen bases, 216 bases on balls, .336 on-base percentage and .486 slugging percentage. He finished his career with a .988 fielding percentage. In 12 postseason games, he hit .294 (10-for-34) with 6 runs, 3 doubles, 1 home run, 5 RBI, 2 stolen bases and 3 walks.

See also
List of players with a home run in first major league at-bat

References

External links

1975 births
Living people
Albany Polecats players
American expatriate baseball players in Canada
Anaheim Angels players
Baseball players from California
Harrisburg Senators players
Major League Baseball first basemen
Montreal Expos players
Ottawa Lynx players
People from Chatsworth, Los Angeles
Texas Rangers players
Toronto Blue Jays players
West Palm Beach Expos players
Montclair College Preparatory School alumni